FC Geghard, is a defunct Armenian football club from Abovyan, Kotayk Province. The club participated in the initial Armenian First League season in 1992. However, the club was dissolved prior to the kick-off of the 1993 season of the First League.

League record

References

Association football clubs disestablished in 1993
Geghard
1993 disestablishments in Armenia